is a Japanese manufacturer of confectioneries. Its head office is in Nishi-ku, Nagoya.

About
Marukawa was founded in 1888, however, it was established under its current name in 1948. It is a major international company in the field of Bubble Gum.

In addition to manufacturing and selling Marukawa brand bubble gums for over half a century, it also manufactures private brand bubble gums according to the customers' requirements. The company's capital stands at JP¥75,000,000. Its main banks are The Bank of Tokyo-Mitsubishi UFJ,. Ltd., and Mizuho Bank Ltd.

Timeline

1888 - Started making confectionery
1947 - Started manufacturing Bubble Gum
1948 - Established Marukawa Conf. Co., Ltd.
1957 - Started trading throughout the world

References

External links

Marukawagum.com English website

Marukawa 

Brand name confectionery
Food and drink companies of Japan
Manufacturing companies based in Nagoya
Food and drink companies established in 1888
Japanese companies established in 1888
Confectionery companies of Japan